"I Wandered Lonely as a Cloud" (also commonly known as "Daffodils") is a lyric poem by William Wordsworth. It is one of his most popular, and was inspired by a forest encounter on 15 April 1802 between he, his younger sister Dorothy and a "long belt" of daffodils. Written in 1804, it was first published in 1807 in Poems, in Two Volumes, and as a revision in 1815.

In a poll conducted in 1995 by the BBC Radio 4 Bookworm programme to determine the nation's favourite poems, I Wandered Lonely as a Cloud came fifth. Often anthologised, it is now seen as a classic of English Romantic poetry, although Poems, in Two Volumes was poorly reviewed by Wordsworth's contemporaries.

Background

The inspiration for the poem came from a walk Wordsworth took with his sister Dorothy around Glencoyne Bay, Ullswater, in the Lake District. He would draw on this to compose "I Wandered Lonely as a Cloud" in 1804, inspired by Dorothy's journal entry describing the walk near a lake at Grasmere in England:

At the time he wrote the poem, Wordsworth was living with his wife, Mary Hutchinson, and sister Dorothy at Town End, in Grasmere in the Lake District. Mary contributed what Wordsworth later said were the two best lines in the poem, recalling the "tranquil restoration" of Tintern Abbey,

"They flash upon that inward eye
Which is the bliss of solitude"

Wordsworth was aware of the appropriateness of the idea of daffodils which "flash upon that inward eye" because in his 1815 version he added a note commenting on the "flash" as an "ocular spectrum". Coleridge in Biographia Literaria of 1817, while acknowledging the concept of "visual spectrum" as being "well known", described Wordsworth's (and Mary's) lines, among others, as "mental bombast". Fred Blick has shown that the idea of flashing flowers was derived from the "Elizabeth Linnaeus phenomenon", so called because of the discovery of flashing flowers by Elizabeth Linnaeus in 1762. Wordsworth described it as "rather an elementary feeling and simple impression (approaching to the nature of an ocular spectrum) upon the imaginative faculty, rather than an exertion of it..." The phenomenon was reported upon in 1789 and 1794 by Erasmus Darwin, whose work Wordsworth certainly read.

The entire household thus contributed to the poem. Nevertheless, Wordsworth's biographer Mary Moorman notes that Dorothy was excluded from the poem, even though she had seen the daffodils together with Wordsworth. The poem itself was placed in a section of Poems in Two Volumes entitled "Moods of my Mind" in which he grouped together his most deeply felt lyrics. Others included "To a Butterfly", a childhood recollection of chasing butterflies with Dorothy, and "The Sparrow's Nest", in which he says of Dorothy "She gave me eyes, she gave me ears".

The earlier Lyrical Ballads, a collection of poems by both Wordsworth and Samuel Taylor Coleridge, had been first published in 1798 and had started the romantic movement in England. It had brought Wordsworth and the other Lake poets into the poetic limelight. Wordsworth had published nothing new since the 1800 edition of Lyrical Ballads, and a new publication was eagerly awaited. Wordsworth had gained some financial security by the 1805 publication of the fourth edition of Lyrical Ballads; it was the first from which he enjoyed the profits of copyright ownership. He decided to turn away from the long poem he was working on (The Recluse) and devote more attention to publishing Poems in Two Volumes, in which "I Wandered Lonely as a Cloud" first appeared.

Revision 

Wordsworth revised the poem in 1815. He replaced "dancing"  with "golden"; "along" with "beside"; and "ten thousand" with "fluttering and". He then added a stanza between the first and second, and changed "laughing" to "jocund". The last stanza was left untouched.

Pamela Wolfe wrote that "The permanence of stars as compared with flowers emphasises the permanence of memory for the poet." Andrew Motion, in a piece about the enduring appeal of the poem, wrote  that "the final verse … replicates in the minds of its readers the very experience it describes".

Reception

Contemporary 

Poems, in Two Volumes was poorly reviewed by Wordsworth's contemporaries, including Lord Byron, whom Wordsworth came to despise. Byron said of the volume, in one of its first reviews, "Mr. [Wordsworth] ceases to please, ... clothing [his ideas] in language not simple, but puerile". Wordsworth himself wrote ahead to soften the thoughts of The Critical Review, hoping his friend Francis Wrangham would push for a softer approach. He succeeded in preventing a known enemy from writing the review, but it did not help; as Wordsworth himself said, it was a case of, "Out of the frying pan, into the fire". Of any positives within Poems, in Two Volumes, the perceived masculinity in "The Happy Warrior", written on the death of Nelson and unlikely to be the subject of attack, was one such. Poems like "I Wandered Lonely as a Cloud" could not have been further from it. Wordsworth took the reviews stoically.

Even Wordsworth's close friend Coleridge said (referring especially to the "child-philosopher" stanzas VII and VIII of "Intimations of Immortality") that the poems contained "mental bombast". Two years later, many were more positive about the collection. Samuel Rogers said that he had "dwelt particularly on the beautiful idea of the 'Dancing Daffodils'", and this was echoed by Henry Crabb Robinson. Critics were rebutted by public opinion, and the work gained in popularity and recognition, as did Wordsworth.

Poems, in Two Volumes was savagely reviewed by Francis Jeffrey in the Edinburgh Review (without singling out "I wandered lonely as a Cloud"), but the Review was well known for its dislike of the Lake Poets. As Sir Walter Scott put it at the time of the poem's publication, "Wordsworth is harshly treated in the Edinburgh Review, but Jeffrey gives ... as much praise as he usually does", and indeed Jeffrey praised the sonnets.

Upon the author's death in 1850, The Westminster Review called "I wandered lonely as a Cloud" "very exquisite".

Settings to music 
The poem has been set to music, for example by Eric Thiman in the 20th century.
In 2007, Cumbria Tourism released a rap version of the poem, featuring MC Nuts, a Lake District red squirrel, in an attempt to capture the "YouTube generation" and attract tourists to the Lake District. Published on the two-hundredth anniversary of the original, it attracted wide media attention. It was welcomed by the Wordsworth Trust, but attracted the disapproval of some commentators.

In 2019 Cumbria Rural Choirs with help from the Leche Trust commissioned a setting by Tamsin Jones, which was to have been performed in March 2020 at Carlisle Cathedral with British Sinfonietta, but because of COVID restrictions in the UK the premiere was delayed until 2022.

Modern usage 
The poem is presented and taught in many schools in the English-speaking world.

UK 
These include the English Literature GCSE course in some examination boards in England, Wales, and Northern Ireland. 
In 2004, in celebration of the 200th anniversary of the writing of the poem, it was read aloud by 150,000 British schoolchildren, aimed both at improving recognition of poetry and supporting Marie Curie Cancer Care (which uses the daffodil as a symbol, for example in the Great Daffodil Appeal).

Abroad 
It is used in the current Higher School Certificate syllabus topic, Inner Journeys, New South Wales, Australia. It is also frequently used as a part of the Junior Certificate English Course in Ireland as part of the Poetry Section. The poem is also included in the syllabus for the Grade X ICSE (Indian Certificate of Secondary Education) examination, India.

V. S. Naipaul, who grew up in Trinidad when it was a British colony, mentions a "campaign against Wordsworth" in the island because "daffodils are not flowers Trinidad schoolchildren know", though he did not agree with it. Jean Rhys, another writer who was born in the British West Indies, objected to daffodils through one of her characters. It has been suggested that colonisation of the Caribbean resulted in a "daffodil gap". This refers to the perceived difference between the lived experience and imported English literature.

In popular culture

 In the 2013 musical Big Fish, composed by Andrew Lippa, some lines from the poem are used in the song "Daffodils", which concludes the first act. Lippa mentioned this in a video created by Broadway.com in the same year.
 In Gucci's Spring/Summer 2019 Collection, multiple ready-to-wear pieces featured embroidery of the last lines of the poem.

Parodies
Because it is one of the best-known poems in the English language, it has frequently been the subject of parody and satire.

The English prog rock band Genesis parodies the poem in the opening lyrics to the song "The Colony of Slippermen", from their 1974 album The Lamb Lies Down on Broadway.

It was the subject of a 1985 Heineken beer TV advertisement, which depicts a poet having difficulties with his opening lines, only able to come up with "I walked about a bit on my own" or "I strolled around without anyone else" until downing a Heineken and reaching the immortal "I wandered lonely as a cloud" (because "Heineken refreshes the poets other beers can't reach"). The assertion that Wordsworth originally hit on "I wandered lonely as a cow" until Dorothy told him "William, you can't put that" occasionally finds its way into print.

Tourism and exhibitions in Cumbria
Two important tourist attractions in Cumbria are Wordsworth's homes Dove Cottage with its adjacent visitors centre and Rydal Mount. They have hosted exhibitions related to the poem. For example, in 2022 the British Library's unique manuscript of the poem was lent to the Wordsworth Trust as part of a "treasures on tour" programme. It went on display in Grasmere alongside the Trust's own copy of Dorothy Wordsworth's Grasmere journal.

There are still daffodils to be seen in the county. The daffodils Wordsworth described would have been wild daffodils. The National Gardens Scheme runs a Daffodil Day every year, allowing visitors to view daffodils in Cumbrian gardens including Dora's Field, which was planted by Wordsworth. In 2013, the event was held in March, when unusually cold weather meant that relatively few of the plants were in flower. April, the month that Wordsworth saw the daffodils at Ullswater, is usually a good time to view them, although the Lake District climate has changed since the poem was written.

200th anniversary
In 2015, events marking the 200th anniversary of the publication of the revised version were celebrated at Rydal Mount.

Notes

References

Bibliography 
 Davies, Hunter. William Wordsworth, Weidenfeld and Nicolson 1980
 Gill, Stephen. William Wordsworth: A Life, Oxford University Press 1989
 Moorman, Mary. William Wordsworth, A Biography: The Early Years, 1770–1803 v. 1, Oxford University Press 1957
 Moorman, Mary. William Wordsworth: A Biography: The Later Years, 1803–50 v. 2, Oxford University Press 1965
 Wordsworth, Dorothy (ed. Pamela Woof). The Grasmere and Alfoxden Journals. Oxford University Press 2002

External links 

 Daffodils, The Wordsworth Trust
 Information about William Wordsworth
 Facsimile of Dorothy's "daffodils" entry in her journal
 Google Books archive of Poems in Two Volumes Volume II
 
 Preface to Lyrical Ballads
 Google Books archive of Francis Jeffrey's review of Poems in Two Volumes
 "Daffodils" set to music From the 1990 concept album "Tyger and Other Tales"
 I wandered lonely as a Cloud (Daffodils), Theme of Man and the Natural World

Poetry by William Wordsworth
1804 poems
1807 poems
1815 poems
Lake District in fiction
Quotations from literature
Redirects from opening lines
1800s neologisms